Wolfblood is a teen supernatural-drama television series, broadcast on the CBBC channel in the United Kingdom, and also shown worldwide. A webisode titled "The Scape Goat" takes place between the first and second series. A series of seven webisodes known as Jana Bites takes place between the second and third series. An online animated motion comic known as New Moon Rising, which comes in three parts, takes place between the third and fourth series. An online animated motion comic known as Hunter's Moon, which comes in three parts, takes place between the fourth and fifth series. Ten mini-episodes known as Wolfblood Secrets, which also takes place between the fourth and fifth series, has aired. An extra webisode called Lore aired 19 October 2016. An online animated motion comic known as Wolfblood Alpha, which is in three parts, takes place after the fourth series.

Series overview

Episodes

Series 1 (2012)

Series 2 (2013)

Series 3 (2014)

Series 4 (2016)

Series 5 (2017)

References

Lists of British children's television series episodes
Lists of British fantasy television series episodes